Coreura sinerubra is a moth of the subfamily Arctiinae. It was described by William James Kaye in 1919. It is found in Peru.

References

Euchromiina
Moths described in 1919